Bride for Sale is a 1949 American romantic comedy film distributed by RKO Radio Pictures, directed by William D. Russell, and starring Claudette Colbert, Robert Young and George Brent. The music score is by Frederick Hollander.

Plot
Nora Shelley is a tax expert for the accounting company which is led by Paul Martin. She thinks she can find a suitable husband by inspecting their clients' tax documents.  Martin finds out and tries to dissuade her from this approach, later enlisting the help of his friend Steve Adams, who tries to woo Shelley.

Cast
Claudette Colbert as Nora Shelley
Robert Young as Steve Adams
George Brent as Paul Martin
Max Baer as Litka
Gus Schilling as Timothy
Charles Arnt as Dobbs
Mary Bear as Miss Stone
Ann Tyrrell as Miss Swanson
Paul Maxey as Gentry
Burk Symon as Setley

References

External links
 
 
 

1949 films
1949 romantic comedy films
American black-and-white films
American romantic comedy films
Films directed by William D. Russell
Films scored by Friedrich Hollaender
1940s English-language films
1940s American films